Hovhannisyan or Hovannisyan is an Armenian surname meaning "son of Hovhannes", the Armenian equivalent of John, thus making it equivalent to Johnson. It is the most common surname in Armenia.

Variants of the name in Armenian and Western Armenian include Hovhannesian, Hovannesian, Hovannisian, Hovhannisian and Oganessian.

Notable people with the surname include:

Hovhannisyan
Armen Hovhannisyan (1994–2014), Nagorno-Karabakh Republic Defense Army soldier
Art Hovhannisyan, Armenian-American boxer
Artak Hovhannisyan, Armenian sport wrestler
Artsrun Hovhannisyan, press secretary of the Armenian Ministry of Defense.
Ashot Hovhannisyan, Armenian politician
Azat Hovhannisyan, Armenian boxer
Edgar Hovhannisyan, Armenian composer
Khoren Hovhannisyan, Armenian football midfielder
Lilit Hovhannisyan, Armenian singer
Lusine Hovhannisyan, Armenian footballer
Robert Hovhannisyan, Armenian chess Grandmaster
Sargis Hovhannisyan, Armenian football defender
Vahan Hovhannisyan (1956–2014), Armenian politician and minister
Vardan Hovhannisyan, Armenian director and producer
Zhirayr Hovhannisyan, Armenian sport wrestler
Zhora Hovhannisyan, Armenian footballer

Hovanessian
Diana Der Hovanessian (????–2018), Armenian American poet, translator and author
Vartan Hovanessian (1896–1982), Iranian Armenian architect

Hovannisian
Ashot Hovhannisian (1887–1972), Armenian Marxist historian, theorist and Communist official
Garin Hovannisian (born 1986), Armenian American writer, filmmaker, and producer
Larisa Hovannisian (born 1988), Armenian-American social entrepreneur and founder of Teach For Armenia
Raffi Hovannisian, American-born Armenian politician, Foreign Minister of Armenia
Richard Hovannisian (born 1932), Armenian American historian and professor emeritus

Hovhannessian

Oganessian

 Armen Oganesyan (born 1954), CEO of Russian state radio station Voice of Russia
 Gaguik Oganessian (1947-2015), Armenian chess player, writer and organiser
 Khoren Oganesian (born 1955), Soviet footballer
 Yuri Oganessian (born 1933), Russian-Armenian nuclear physicist

Real names
Grigor Ter-Hovhannisian (1854–1908), real name of Armenian writer known by the pseudonym Muratsan
Michael Hovhannisyan (1867–1933), Armenian writer known by the pseudonym Nar-Dos
Nikoghayos Ter-Hovhannisyan (1867–1914), Armenian fedayee from Karabakh known by his pseudonym Nikol Duman
Sargis Hovhannisian (1879–1919), Armenian revolutionary, statesman, and a leading member of the Armenian Revolutionary Federation (Dashnaktsutyun) party. He is widely regarded as the founder of the First Republic of Armenia
Zabel Hovhannessian, birth name of Ottoman Armenian writer Zabel Yesayan

Armenian-language surnames
Patronymic surnames
Surnames from given names